Patrick Houlihan (25 March 1889 – 4 May 1963) was an Irish politician. A farmer, he was first elected to Dáil Éireann as a Fianna Fáil Teachta Dála (TD) for the Clare constituency at the June 1927 general election. He was re-elected at the September 1927 general election but lost his seat at the 1932 general election. He was elected again at the 1933 general election, but lost his seat at the 1937 general election.

References

1889 births
1963 deaths
Fianna Fáil TDs
Members of the 5th Dáil
Members of the 6th Dáil
Members of the 8th Dáil
Politicians from County Clare
Irish farmers